Pacific Western Airlines was a Canadian airline.

Pacific Western may also refer to:
Pacific Western Transportation, a Canadian transportation company
Pacific Western Productions, company founded by Gale Anne Hurd
Pacific Western University, the former name for California Miramar University
Pacific Western University (Hawaii), a defunct school formerly based in Hawaii
Pacific & Western Bank of Canada, a Canadian bank
Pacific Western Oil Co., an oil company founded in 1928, later merged to Getty Oil
Bourdieu v. Pacific Western Oil Co., a 1936 Supreme Court of the United States decision
Pacific Western Systems Interface.

See also
Western Pacific (disambiguation)